Melvin N. Zimmer (October 4, 1938 – January 4, 2002) was an American politician who served in the New York State Assembly from the 120th district from 1975 to 1991.

He died after being hit by a car on January 4, 2002, in Syracuse, New York at age 63.

References

1938 births
2002 deaths
Democratic Party members of the New York State Assembly
20th-century American politicians
Road incident deaths in New York (state)
Pedestrian road incident deaths